Michael David Raiter (born 19 September 1953) is a Christian preacher and trainer of preachers and a former principal of the Melbourne School of Theology in Melbourne, Australia. He is also the author of a number of books, including Stirrings of the Soul (Matthias Media, 2003), which won the 2004 SPCK Australian Christian Book of the Year Award.

His book Meet Jesus is available as a reading plan on the YouVersion Bible app and also on the EasyEnglish Bible website. 

Born in Liverpool, England and raised in the New South Wales town of Dapto, Raiter began his career as a high school teacher in Sydney and Pakistan. After studying at Moore Theological College he returned to Pakistan to teach at the Zarephath Bible Institute. In 1997 he joined the faculty at Moore College as head of the Department of Missions. From 2006–2011 Raiter was the principal of the Bible College of Victoria (now the Melbourne School of Theology), an evangelical theological college.

In 2012, Raiter launched the Centre for Biblical Preaching, an independent specialist training institute for preachers hosted by St James Old Cathedral, Melbourne West, where he is also appointed to the staff and takes about a quarter of the preaching. The centre was created in active partnership with CMS Australia, and about a third of his time is spent delivering training and workshops internationally through them.

External links
Centre for Biblical Preaching website
St James' Old Cathedral website
CMS Australia website
Melbourne School of Theology website

References

Living people
Evangelical Anglicans
Australian Anglicans
1953 births
Moore Theological College alumni
Clergy from Liverpool
Seminary presidents
People from Wollongong
British emigrants to Australia